David A. Wagner (born 1974) is a professor of computer science at the University of California, Berkeley and a well-known researcher in cryptography and computer security. He is a member of the Election Assistance Commission's Technical Guidelines Development Committee, tasked with assisting the EAC in drafting the Voluntary Voting System Guidelines. He is also a member of the ACCURATE project.

Wagner received an A.B. in mathematics from Princeton University in 1995, an M.S. in computer science from Berkeley in 1999, and a Ph.D. in computer science from Berkeley in 2000.

He has published two books and over 90 peer-reviewed scientific papers. His notable achievements include:
 2007 Served as principal investigator for the source code review and also the documentation review of the historic California state Top-to-Bottom review of electronic voting systems certified for use. Flaws found with vendor-supplied voting machines resulted in decertification and provisional recertification by the Secretary of State.
 2001 Cryptanalysis of WEP, the security protocol used in 802.11 "WiFi" networks (with Nikita Borisov and Ian Goldberg).
 2000 Cryptanalysis of the A5/1 stream cipher used in GSM cellphones (with Alex Biryukov and Adi Shamir).
 1999 Cryptanalysis of Microsoft's PPTP tunnelling protocol (with Bruce Schneier and "Mudge").
 1999 Invention of the slide attack, a new form of cryptanalysis (with Alex Biryukov); also the boomerang attack and mod n cryptanalysis (the latter with Bruce Schneier and John Kelsey).
 1998 Development of Twofish block cipher, which was a finalist for NIST's Advanced Encryption Standard competition (with Bruce Schneier, John Kelsey, Doug Whiting, Chris Hall, and Niels Ferguson).
 1997 Cryptanalyzed the CMEA algorithm used in many U.S. cellphones (with Bruce Schneier).
 1995  Discovered a flaw in the implementation of SSL in Netscape Navigator (with Ian Goldberg).

References

External links
 Professor Wagner's home page
 David Wagner election research papers
 Some of Wagner's publications
  
 Another interview

1974 births
Living people
Modern cryptographers
Princeton University alumni
UC Berkeley College of Engineering alumni
People associated with computer security
UC Berkeley College of Engineering faculty
American computer scientists
Election technology people